2014 Nigeria school attack may refer to:

 2014 Potiskum bombings
 2014 Potiskum school bombing
 Chibok schoolgirls kidnapping
 February 2014 Buni Yadi massacre